Glyn Ivor Davies (24 November 1909 – 1985) was a Welsh amateur footballer who played in the Football League for Swansea Town and Norwich City as an outside left. He was capped by Wales at amateur level.

References 

Welsh footballers
English Football League players
Wales amateur international footballers
Association football outside forwards
1909 births
Footballers from Swansea
Swansea City A.F.C. players
Brentford F.C. players
Casuals F.C. players
1985 deaths
Place of death missing
Norwich City F.C. players
Isthmian League players